Michelle Perry (born May 1, 1979 in Los Angeles, California) is an American athlete. At the 2004 Summer Olympics she placed 14th overall in the heptathlon competition. Later, at the 2005 World Championships in Athletics, she earned a gold medal in the 100 m hurdles with a time of 12.66 seconds. Her current personal record in the event is 12.43 seconds.

Perry attended Quartz Hill High School in Lancaster, California and finished second in the 1997 CIF California State Meet in the Long jump.

At the 2007 World Championships in Athletics in Osaka, Japan she successfully defended her title with another 100 m hurdles gold medal performance; winning in a time of 12.46 seconds. The result was surrounded by some debate since she ran on the next lane (Susanna Kallur's lane) and some think she made contact with the Swede over the last hurdle. Despite television evidence, there was no official decision as the Swedish protest was filed too late.

Perry missed out on a spot for the 2008 Beijing Olympics, but made the team for the 2009 World Championships in Athletics. However, she was unable to defend her title as she entered the competition with a knee injury and was eliminated in the first round. She missed the 2010 and 2011 seasons due to injury and pregnancy.

Audio interviews
Michelle reflects on her 2007 and second consecutive 100m World Championship gold medal

References

External links

Michelle Perry's U.S. Olympic Team bio

1979 births
Living people
American female hurdlers
American heptathletes
Athletes (track and field) at the 2003 Pan American Games
Athletes (track and field) at the 2004 Summer Olympics
Olympic track and field athletes of the United States
UCLA Bruins women's track and field athletes
World Athletics Championships medalists
Track and field athletes from Los Angeles
World Athletics Championships winners
Pan American Games track and field athletes for the United States
20th-century American women
21st-century American women